Kambayashi (written: 神林 or 上林) is a Japanese surname. Notable people with the surname include:

, Japanese writer
, Japanese writer

Japanese-language surnames